Various letters have been used to write the click consonants of southern Africa. The precursors of the current IPA letters, were created by Karl Richard Lepsius and used by Wilhelm Bleek and Lucy Lloyd, who added .

Also influential were Daniel Jones, who created the letters  which were promoted by the IPA from 1921 to 1989, and were used by Clement Doke and Douglas Beach.

Individual languages have had various orthographies, usually based on either the Lepsius alphabet or on the Latin alphabet. They may change over time or between countries. Latin letters, such as c x q ç, have case forms; the pipe letters, ǀ ǁ ǃ ǂ, do not.

Multiple systems

By the early 19th century, the otherwise unneeded letters c x q were used as the basis for writing clicks in Zulu by British and German missions. However, for general linguistics this was confusing, as each of these letters had other uses. There were various ad hoc attempts to create letters—often iconic symbols—for click consonants, with the most successful being those of the Standard Alphabet by Lepsius, which were based on a single symbol (pipe, double pipe, pipe-acute, pipe-sub-dot) and from which the modern Khoekhoe letters  descend.

During the First World War, Daniel Jones created the equivalent letters  in response to a 1914 request to fill this gap in the IPA, and these were published in 1921 (see history of the International Phonetic Alphabet).

By 1911, if not earlier, Lucy Lloyd created the letter  for bilabial clicks.

Clement Doke expanded on Jones' letters in 1923. Based on an empirically informed conception of the nature of click consonants, he analyzed voiced and nasal clicks as separate consonants, much as voiced plosives and nasals are considered separate consonants from voiceless plosives among the pulmonic consonants, and so added letters for voiced and nasal clicks. (Jones' palatal click letter was not used, however. Jones had called it "velar", and Doke called palatal clicks "alveolar".) Doke was the first to report retroflex clicks.

Douglas Beach would publish a somewhat similar system in his phonetic description of Khoekhoe. Because Khoekhoe had no voiced clicks, he only created new letters for the four nasal clicks. Again, he didn't use Jones' "velar" click letter, but created one of his own, based on the Lepsius letter  but graphically modified to better fit the design of the IPA.

Besides the difference in letter shape (variations on a pipe for Lepsius, modifications of Latin letters for Jones), there was a conceptual difference between them and Doke or Beach: Lepsius used one letter as the base for all click consonants of the same place of articulation (called the 'influx'), and added a second letter or diacritic for the manner of articulation (called the 'efflux'), treating them as two distinct sounds (the click proper and its accompaniment), whereas Doke used a separate letter for each tenuis, voiced, and nasal click, treating each as a distinct consonant, following the example of the Latin alphabet, where the voiced and nasal occlusives also treated as distinct consonants (p b m, t d n, c j ñ, k g ŋ).

Doke's nasal-click letters were based on the letter , continuing the pattern of the pulmonic nasal consonants . The voiced-click letters are more individuated, a couple were simply inverted versions of the tenuis-click letters. The tenuis–voiced pairs were dental  (the letter  had not yet been added to the IPA for the voiced velar fricative), alveolar , retroflex  , palatal ⋎𝗅 ⋏ꞁ and lateral  ꔛ. A proposal to add Doke's letters to Unicode was not approved.

Beach wrote on Khoekhoe and so had no need for letters for the voiced clicks; he created letters for nasal clicks by adding a curl to the bottom of the tenuis-click letters: .

Doke and Beach both wrote aspirated clicks with an h, and the glottalized nasal clicks as an oral click with a glottal stop, . Beach also wrote the affricate contour clicks with an x, .

Transcribing voicing, nasalization and the velar–uvular distinction
Doke had run "admirable" experiments establishing the nature of click consonants as unitary sounds. Nonetheless, Bleek in his highly influential work on Bushman languages rejected Doke's orthography on theoretical grounds, arguing that each of Doke's letters stood for two sounds, "a combination of the implosive sound with the sound made by the expulsion of the breath" (that is, influx plus efflux), and that it was impossible to write the clicks themselves in Doke's orthography, as "we cannot call [the implosive sounds] either unvoiced, voiced, or nasal." Bleek therefore used digraphs based on the Lepsius letters, as Lepsius himself had done for the same reason. However, linguists have since come down on the side of Doke and take the two places of articulation to be inherent in the nature of clicks, because both are required to create a click: the 'influx' cannot exist without the 'efflux', so a symbol for an influx has only theoretical meaning just as a symbol like  for 'alveolar consonant' does not indicate any actual consonant. Regardless, today separate letters like Doke's are not provided by the IPA (or other systems), and linguists resort to diacritics that would not be used for non-click consonants.

Summarized below are the common means of representing voicing, nasalization and dorsal place of articulation, from Bleek's digraphs reflecting an analysis as co-articulated consonants, to those same letters written as superscripts to function as diacritics, reflecting an analysis as unitary consonants, to the more common IPA combining diacritics for voicing and nasalization. Because the last option cannot indicate the posterior place of articulation, it does not distinguish velar from uvular clicks. The letter Ʞ is used here as a wildcard for any click letter.

Historical orthographies
Written languages with clicks generally use an alphabet either based on the Lepsius alphabet, with multigraphs based on the pipe letters for clicks, or on the Zulu alphabet, with multigraphs based on c q x for clicks. In the latter case, there have been several conventions for the palatal clicks. Some languages have had more than one orthography over the years. For example, Khoekhoe has had at least the following, using palatal clicks as an example:

Historical roman orthographies have been based on the following sets of letters:

There are two principal conventions for writing the manners of articulation (the 'effluxes'), which are used with both the Lepsius and Zulu orthographies. One uses g for voicing and x for affricate clicks; the other uses d for voicing and g for affricate clicks. Both use n for nasal clicks, but these letters may come either before or after the base letter. For simplicity, these will be illustrated across various orthographies using the lateral clicks only.

References 

Click consonants
Click languages
Latin-script letters
Phonetic transcription symbols
Phonetic alphabets